The United Kingdom of Great Britain and Northern Ireland competed at the 1994 Winter Paralympics held in Lillehammer, Norway. The team was known by it shortened name of Great Britain, for identification purposes. Twenty-three athletes, all of whom were men,. competed for Britain. The team won five medals at the Games, all bronze, and finished 21st in the medal table. Richard Burt won two medals in alpine skiing, as he had done in the 1992 Games. In addition to the medal performances the team had seven top ten finishes.

Medallists

The following British athletes won medals at the Games. In total five medals were won, all bronze, and the team finished 21st in the medal table. In the 'by discipline' sections below, medallists' names are in bold.

Disability classification

Every participant at the Paralympics has their disability grouped into one of five disability categories; amputation, the condition may be congenital or sustained through injury or illness; cerebral palsy; wheelchair athletes, there is often overlap between this and other categories; visual impairment, including blindness; Les autres, any physical disability that does not fall strictly under one of the other categories, for example dwarfism or multiple sclerosis. Each Paralympic sport then has its own classifications, dependent upon the specific physical demands of competition. Events are given a code, made of numbers and letters, describing the type of event and classification of the athletes competing. Events with "B" in the code are for athletes with visual impairment, codes LW1 to LW9 are for athletes who stand to compete and LW10 to LW12 are for athletes who compete sitting down. In biathlon events, which contain a target shooting component, blind and visually impaired athletes are able to compete through the use of acoustic signals, whose signal intensity varies dependent upon whether or not the athlete is on target.

Alpine skiing

Eight British athletes competed in alpine skiing events, a decrease from the eleven who had competed in the 1992 Games. Six of the athletes had previous Games experience. A total of four bronze medals were won by British skiers. Richard Burt medalled in both the giant slalom and super-G B3 classification, as he had done in 1992. Matthew Stockford, who won three bronze medals at the previous Games, took home a bronze in the super-G LXW and James Barker won bronze in the downhill LWXI.

Biathlon

Three British men competed in biathlon events, all of them had also represented the nation in the 1992 Winter Paralympics. All of Britain's biathletes raced in the  B1 classification, for those with no functional vision and in the shooting component were assisted by acoustic signals to indicate when they were on target. None of the athletes won a medal, the highest placed finisher being Peter Young who came eleventh. Young and James Denton also competed in cross-country skiing events at the Games.

Cross-country skiing

Britain sent two biathletes to the Games, both of whom had also competed in the 1992 Games. Young won the bronze medal in the 5 km event. This was his second Paralympic bronze medal, he won his first in the 1984 Games in the 10 km event.
Denton's best finish was fourteenth in the 10 km event.

Factor percentage

To ensure a fair event when athletes with differing disabilities compete, times achieved are sometimes modified by a factor percentage, to produce a result known as "Finish Time". It is this time that decides the result of the races. Real times recorded are also listed.

Ice sledge hockey

Ice sledge hockey made its first appearance on the Paralympic schedule in Lillehammer. Great Britain sent a squad of 12 athletes to compete in the sport. Five teams competed in a group stage with the top two teams advancing to the gold medal match and third and fourth placed teams playing off for the bronze medal. The British team beat Estonia 2–0, drew 0–0 with both Canada and Norway and lost 7–0 to Sweden to finish fourth in the group. Facing Canada again for the bronze medal, Britain were defeated 2–0.

See also
Great Britain at the Paralympics
Great Britain at the 1994 Winter Olympics

References

External links
International Paralympic Committee official website

Nations at the 1994 Winter Paralympics
1994
Paralympics
Winter sports in the United Kingdom